Burgsdorf is a village and a former municipality in the Mansfeld-Südharz district, Saxony-Anhalt, Germany. Since 1 January 2010, it is part of the town Eisleben.

History
The first documented mention of Burgsdorf is as Burcdorpf in the Hersfeld Tithe Register, compiled in the 9th Century.

Former municipalities in Saxony-Anhalt
Eisleben